According to Christian apocryphal and Islamic tradition, Saint Anne was the mother of Mary and the maternal grandmother of Jesus. Mary's mother is not named in the canonical gospels. In writing, Anne's name and that of her husband Joachim come only from New Testament apocrypha, of which the Gospel of James (written perhaps around 150) seems to be the earliest that mentions them.
The mother of Mary is mentioned but not named in the Quran.

Christian tradition
The story is similar to that of Samuel, whose mother Hannah ( Ḥannāh "favour, grace"; etymologically the same name as Anne) had also been childless. The Immaculate Conception was eventually made dogma by the Catholic Church following an increased devotion to Anne in the twelfth century. Dedications to Anne in Eastern Christianity occur as early as the sixth century. In the Eastern Orthodox tradition, Anne and Joachim are ascribed the title Ancestors of God, and both the Nativity of Mary and the Presentation of Mary are celebrated as two of the twelve Great Feasts of the Orthodox Church. The Dormition of Anne is also a minor feast in Eastern Christianity. In Lutheran Protestantism, it is held that Martin Luther chose to enter religious life as an Augustinian friar after invoking St. Anne while endangered by lightning.

In Islam
Anne is also revered in Islam, recognized as a highly spiritual woman and as the mother of Mary. She is not named in the Quran, where she is referred to as "the wife of Imran". The Quran describes her remaining childless until her old age. One day, Hannah saw a bird feeding its young while sitting in the shade of a tree, which awakened her desire to have children of her own. She prayed for a child and eventually conceived; her husband, Imran, died before the child was born. Expecting the child to be male, Hannah vowed to dedicate him to isolation and service in the Second Temple.

However, Hannah bore a daughter instead, and named her Mary. Her words upon delivering Mary reflect her status as a great mystic, realising that while she had wanted a son, this daughter was God's gift to her:

Beliefs

Although the canonical books of the New Testament never mention the mother of the Virgin Mary, traditions about her family, childhood, education, and eventual betrothal to Joseph developed very early in the history of the church. The oldest and most influential source for these is the apocryphal Gospel of James, first written in Koine Greek around the middle of the second century AD. In the West, the Gospel of James fell under a cloud in the fourth and fifth centuries when it was accused of "absurdities" by Jerome and condemned as untrustworthy by Pope Damasus I, Pope Innocent I, and Pope Gelasius I. However, despite having been condemned by the Church, it was taken over almost in toto by another apocryphal work, the Gospel of Pseudo-Matthew, which popularised most of its stories.

Ancient belief, attested to by a sermon of John of Damascus, was that Anne married once. In the Late Middle Ages, legend held that Anne was married three times: first to Joachim, then to Clopas and finally to a man named Solomas and that each marriage produced one daughter: Mary, mother of Jesus, Mary of Clopas, and Mary Salome, respectively. The sister of Saint Anne was Sobe, mother of Elizabeth. In the fifteenth century, the Catholic cleric Johann Eck related in a sermon that St Anne's parents were named Stollanus and Emerentia. Frederick George Holweck, writing in the Catholic Encyclopedia (1907) regards this genealogy as spurious.

In the fourth century and then much later in the fifteenth century, a belief arose that Mary was conceived of Anne without original sin. This belief in the Immaculate Conception states that God preserved Mary's body and soul intact and sinless from her first moment of existence, through the merits of Jesus Christ. The Immaculate Conception, often confused with the Annunciation of the Incarnation (Mary's virgin birth of Jesus), was made dogma in the Catholic church by Pope Pius IX's papal bull, Ineffabilis Deus, in 1854.

The thirteenth century Speculum Maius of Vincent of Beauvais incorporates information regarding the life of Saint Anne from an earlier work by Hrotsvitha of Gandersheim Abbey.

Veneration
In the Eastern church, the veneration of Anne herself may go back as far as c. 550, when Justinian built a church in Constantinople in her honor. The earliest pictorial sign of her veneration in the West is an eighth-century fresco in the church of Santa Maria Antiqua, Rome.

The Feast of the Conception of the Virgin Mary had reached southern Italy by the ninth century. The cult of Saint Anne had developed in northern Europe by the twelfth century. A shrine at Douai, in northern France, was one of the early centers of devotion to St. Anne in the West.

The Anna Selbdritt was a type of iconography depicting the 3 generations of Saint Anne, Mary, and the child Jesus. Emphasizing the humanity of Jesus, it drew on the earlier conventions of the Seat of Wisdom, and was popular in northern Germany in the 1500s.

During the High Middle Ages, Saint Anne became increasingly identified as a maritime saint, protecting sailors and fisherman, and invoked against storms.

Two well-known shrines to St. Anne are that of Ste-Anne-d'Auray in Brittany, France; and that of Ste-Anne-de-Beaupré near the city of Québec. The number of visitors to the Basilica of Ste-Anne-de-Beaupré is greatest on St Anne's Feast Day, 26 July, and the Sunday before Nativity of the Virgin Mary, 8 September. In 1892, Pope Leo XIII sent a relic of St Anne to the church.

In the Maltese language, the Milky Way galaxy is called It-Triq ta' Sant'Anna, literally "The Way of St. Anne".

In Imperial Russia, the Order of St Anne was one of the leading state decorations.

In the United States, the Daughters of the Holy Spirit named the former Annhurst College in her honor.

Commemoration
By the middle of the seventh century, a distinct feast day, the Conception of St. Anne (Maternity of Holy Anna) celebrating the conception of Mary by Saint Anne, was observed at the Monastery of Saint Sabas. It is now known in the Greek Orthodox Church as the feast of "The Conception by St. Anne of the Most Holy Theotokos", and celebrated on 9 December. In the Roman Catholic Church, the Feast of Saints Anne and Joachim is celebrated on 26 July.

Feast Day

Roman Catholic Church 
 26 July

Eastern Orthodox Church 
 25 July: (Dormition of the Righteous Anna, the Mother of the Most Holy Theotokos)
 9 September: (Holy and Righteous Ancestors of God, Joachim and Anna, Afterfeast of the Nativity of the Mother of God)
 9 December (The Conception by Righteous Anna of the Most Holy Mother of God)

Anglican Communion 
 26 July: Anne is remembered (with Joachim) in the Church of England with a Lesser Festival on 26 July.

Lutheranism 
 26 July

Coptic Orthodox Church and Ethiopian Orthodox Tewahedo Church

 7 November (The Departure of St. Anna (Hannah), the mother of the Theotokos)

Armenian Apostolic Church 

 9 December (The Conception by Righteous Anna of the Most Holy Mother of God)
 Tuesday, 2nd week after Dormition of the Mother of God (with Joachim)

Syro-Malabar Church 

 26 July (Anne and Joachim)

Syro-Malankara Catholic Church 

 9 September (Mar Joachim & Martha Anna)

Maronite Church 

 9 September (St. Anne and Joachim, Parents of the Blessed Virgin Mary)

Relics

The alleged relics of St. Anne were brought from the Holy Land to Constantinople in 710 and were kept there in the church of St. Sophia as late as 1333.

During the twelfth and thirteenth centuries, returning crusaders and pilgrims from the East brought relics of Anne to a number of churches, including most famously those at Apt, in Provence, Ghent, and Chartres. St. Anne's relics have been preserved and venerated in the many cathedrals and monasteries dedicated to her name, for example in Austria, Canada, Germany, Italy, and Greece in the semi-autonomous Mount Athos, and the city of Katerini. Medieval and baroque craftsmanship is evidenced in, for example, the metalwork of the life-size reliquaries containing the bones of her forearm. Examples employing folk art techniques are also known.

Düren has been the main place of pilgrimage for Anne since 1506, when Pope Julius II decreed that her relics should be kept there.

Patronage
The Church of Saint Anne in Beit Guvrin National Park was built by the Byzantines and the Crusaders in the twelfth century, known in Arabic as Khirbet (lit. "ruin") Sandahanna, the mound of Maresha being called Tell Sandahanna.

Saint Anne is patroness of unmarried women, housewives, women in labor or who want to be pregnant, grandmothers, mothers and educators. She is also a patroness of horseback riders, cabinet-makers and miners. As the mother of Mary, this devotion to Saint Anne as the patron of miners arises from the medieval comparison between Mary and Christ and the precious metals silver and gold. Anne's womb was considered the source from which these precious metals were mined. 

She is also the patron saint of: Brittany (France), Chinandega (Nicaragua), the Mi'kmaq people of Canada, Castelbuono (Sicily), Quebec (Canada), Santa Ana (California), Norwich (Connecticut), Detroit (Michigan), Adjuntas (Puerto Rico), Santa Ana and Jucuarán (El Salvador), Berlin (New Hampshire), Santa Ana Pueblo, Seama, and Taos (New Mexico), Chiclana de la Frontera, Marsaskala, Tudela and Fasnia (Spain), Town of Sta Ana Province of Pampanga, St. Anne in Molo, Iloilo City, Hagonoy, Santa Ana, Taguig City, Saint Anne Shrine, Malicboy, Pagbilao, Quezon and Malinao, Albay (Philippines), Santana (Brazil), Saint Anne (Illinois), Sainte Anne Island, Baie Sainte Anne and Praslin Island (Seychelles), Bukit Mertajam and Port Klang (Malaysia), Kľúčové (Slovakia) and South Vietnam. The parish church of Vatican City is Sant'Anna dei Palafrenieri. There is a shrine dedicated to Saint Anne in the Woods in Bristol, United Kingdom.

In art

Christ in the House of His Parents

In John Everett Millais's 1849–50 work, Christ in the House of His Parents,
Anne is shown in her son-in-law Joseph's carpentry shop caring for a young Jesus who had cut his hand on a nail. She joins her daughter Mary, Joseph, and a young boy who will later become known as John the Baptist in caring for the injured hand of Jesus.

Iconography
The subject of Joachim and Anne The Meeting at the Golden Gate was a regular component of artistic cycles of the Life of the Virgin. The couple meet at the Golden Gate of Jerusalem and embrace. They are aware of Anne's pregnancy, of which they have been separately informed by an archangel. This moment stood for the conception of Mary, and the feast was celebrated on the same day as the Immaculate Conception. Art works representing the Golden Gate and the events leading up to it were influenced by the narrative in the widely read Golden Legend of Jacobus de Voragine. The Birth of Mary, the Presentation of Mary and the Marriage of the Virgin were usual components of cycles of the Life of the Virgin in which Anne is normally shown here.

Her emblem is a door. She is often portrayed wearing red and green, representing love and life.

Anne is never shown as present at the Nativity of Christ, but is frequently shown with the infant Christ in various subjects. She is sometimes believed to be depicted in scenes of the Presentation of Jesus at the Temple and the Circumcision of Christ, but in the former case, this likely reflects a misidentification through confusion with Anna the Prophetess. There was a tradition that Anne went (separately) to Egypt and rejoined the Holy Family after their Flight to Egypt. Anne is not seen with the adult Christ, so was regarded as having died during the youth of Jesus. Anne is also shown as the matriarch of the Holy Kinship, the extended family of Jesus, a popular subject in late medieval Germany; some versions of these pictorial and sculptural depictions include Emerentia who was reputed in the fifteenth century to be Anne's mother. In modern devotions, Anne and her husband are invoked for protection for the unborn.

Virgin and Child with Saint Anne
The role of the Messiah's grandparents in salvation history was commonly depicted in early medieval devotional art in a vertical double-Madonna arrangement known as the Virgin and Child with Saint Anne. Another typical subject has Anne teaching the Virgin Mary the Scriptures (see gallery below).

Gallery

Music

 Marc-Antoine Charpentier composed 2 motets :
  Pour Ste Anne, H.315, for 2 voices and continuo (around 1675)
 Canticum Annae, H.325, for 3 voices, 2 treble instruments, and continuo (around 1680).
 Johann Sebastian Bach composed a prelude and fugue :
 Prelude and Fugue in E-Flat Major, BWV 552 (published 1739)

See also
 Church of Saint Anne, Jerusalem
 Church of St. Ann (disambiguation)
 The Line of Saint Anne
 Portal, Catholic patron saint archive
 Statue of Saint Anne, Charles Bridge
 St Anne's College, Oxford
 Virgin and Child with Saint Anne
 Feast of the Conception of the Virgin Mary

Notes

References

External links

 Brief Franciscan Media article on "Sts. Joachim and Ann"
 "Saint Anne" at the Christian Iconography website
 "Here Followeth the Nativity of Our Blessed Lady" from the Caxton translation of the Golden Legend
 The Protevangelium of James
 The Gospel of Pseudo-Matthew
 Reames, Sherry L. ed.,"Legends of St. Anne, Mother of the Virgin Mary: Introduction", Middle English Legends of Women Saints, Medieval Institute Publications, Kalamazoo, Michigan, 2003
 Welsh, Jennifer. The Cult of St. Anne in Medieval and Early Modern Europe. Routledge, 2017.

 
Ante-Nicene Christian female saints
1st-century BCE Jews
Angelic visionaries
Anglican saints
Christian saints from the New Testament
Family of Jesus
Joachim
Mary, mother of Jesus
New Testament apocrypha people
People of the Quran 
Saints from the Holy Land
Judean people